Eulimella ventricosa is a species of sea snail, a marine gastropod mollusk in the family Pyramidellidae, the pyrams and their allies.

Description
The shell is yellowish white with irregular light chestnut undulating longitudinal stripes, more or less intensified into revolving bands. The size of the shell varies between 1.9 mm and 6.2 mm. Compared to Eulimella acicula, the shell of Eulimella ventricosa is thinner, with tumid whorls and a deeper suture.  The shell is slightly striated longitudinally, with the body whorl ventricose.  The columella is triplicate.

Distribution
This species occurs in the following locations  at depths between 65 m and 480 m:

 Atlantic Europe
 Canary Islands
 Cape Verdes
 European waters (ERMS scope)
 Greek Exclusive Economic Zone: Aegean Sea
 Irish Exclusive economic Zone
 Madeira
 Northwest Atlantic Ocean (from Iceland to Norway)
 Portuguese Exclusive Economic Zone
 Spanish Exclusive Economic Zone
 United Kingdom Exclusive Economic Zone

Notes
Additional information regarding this species:
 Taxonomic Remark: The name Pyramidella ventricosa or Eulimella ventricosa (type locality: eastern Mediterranean) has been misapplied to a western Atlantic species (for which, see Eulimella polita (A. E. Verrill, 1872)) and to an Indo-Pacific species, the identity of which is uncertain.

References

 Gofas, S.; Le Renard, J.; Bouchet, P. (2001). Mollusca. in: Costello, M.J. et al. (eds), European Register of Marine Species: a check-list of the marine species in Europe and a bibliography of guides to their identification. Patrimoines Naturels. 50: 180-213
 de Kluijver, M. J.; Ingalsuo, S. S.; de Bruyne, R. H. (2000). Macrobenthos of the North Sea [CD-ROM]: 1. Keys to Mollusca and Brachiopoda. World Biodiversity Database CD-ROM Series. Expert Center for Taxonomic Identification (ETI): Amsterdam, The Netherlands. . 1 cd-rom.

External links
 
 Forbes E. (1844). Report on the Mollusca and Radiata of the Aegean sea, and on their distribution, considered as bearing on geology. Reports of the British Association for the Advancement of Science for 1843. 130-193
 Jeffreys, J. G. (1847). Descriptions and notices of British shells. Annals and. Magazine of Natural History. 19: 309-314
 To Biodiversity Heritage Library (23 publications)
 To CLEMAM
 To Encyclopedia of Life
 To Marine Species Identification Portal
 To World Register of Marine Species

ventricosa
Gastropods described in 1844
Molluscs of the Atlantic Ocean
Molluscs of the Mediterranean Sea